Ian Colin Hutcheon (born February 1942) is a Scottish amateur golfer. He was one of the leading British amateurs of the 1970s. As an individual, he won the Scottish Amateur in 1973 and was Scottish Amateur Stroke Play Champion three times. He represented Great Britain and Ireland in four Walker Cup matches and three times in the Eisenhower Trophy.

Hutcheon is most remembered for his part in winning the 1976 Eisenhower Trophy at Penina Golf Club in Portugal, where he was also the joint lowest scorer over the four rounds, tied with Chen Tze-ming from Chinese Taipei. Great Britain and Ireland led by two strokes after three rounds over Australia, Japan and the United States. On the final day Hutcheon scored 71 while the other three members of the team scored 76, 77 and 78. The team score of 224, the best three scores, was the lowest of the day, matched by Japan, and gave the team a two shot win. Hutcheon's 71 was the lowest of the day and his back-9 of 34 was the lowest of the week.

Hutcheon has been a member of Monifieth Golf Club for over 60 years. He was a scratch golfer into his 70s.

Amateur wins
1971 Scottish Amateur Stroke Play Championship
1973 Scottish Amateur
1974 Scottish Amateur Stroke Play Championship
1979 Scottish Amateur Stroke Play Championship
1980 Lytham Trophy

Team appearances
European Amateur Team Championship (representing Scotland): 1973, 1975 (winners, individual leader), 1977 (winners), 1979, 1981
Walker Cup (representing Great Britain & Ireland): 1975, 1977, 1979, 1981
Eisenhower Trophy (representing Great Britain & Ireland): 1974, 1976 (team winners, joint individual leader), 1980
St Andrews Trophy (representing Great Britain & Ireland): 1974, 1976 (winners)
Commonwealth Tournament (representing Great Britain): 1975

References

Scottish male golfers
Amateur golfers
People from Monifieth
Sportspeople from Angus, Scotland
1942 births
Living people